Neogyps is an extinct monotypic genus of Old World vulture. Despite being an "Old World" vulture taxonomically, it was native the New World, with its fossils having been found in western North America, including in the La Brea Tar Pits of southern California, dating to the Late Pleistocene. Several morphological characters suggest that Neogyps is closely related to the subfamily Gypaetinae.

References

Old World vultures
Pleistocene birds of North America